Kiu or KIU may refer to:

Universities 
 Kampala International University, in Uganda
 Karakoram International University, in Gilgit, Pakistan
 Kutaisi International University, in Kutaisi, Georgia
 Kobe International University, in Kobe, Japan
 Kyiv International University, in Ukraine
 Kyoto International University, in Kyōtanabe, Japan
 Kyushu International University, in Kitakyūshū, Japan

Languages 
 Kirmanjki language, the northern dialect of Zaza, spoken in eastern Turkey

Other uses 
 Kid Icarus: Uprising, a 2012 video game for the Nintendo 3DS.
 Kiu, a settlement in Kenya
 Kurdistan Islamic Union, a political party in Iraq
 kilo–international unit (kIU), in pharmacology
 Kiu (喜雨) - a Kigo, – late summer – lit. "pleasure rain"; rain that falls after hot and dry weather